Helga Rullestad (born 27 March 1949) is a Norwegian politician for the Labour Party.

She was born in Karmøy as a daughter of painter Harald Naley and housewife Olena Eilertsen. She took lower secondary education in Skudeneshavn, commerce school in Skien and upper secondary school in Kopervik. She held various jobs during her career.

She became involved in politics, and has been a member of Karmøy municipal council since 1987, since 1991 in the executive committee. She also served as a deputy representative to the Parliament of Norway from Rogaland during the terms 1997–2001 and 2001–2005.

References

1949 births
Living people
People from Karmøy
Labour Party (Norway) politicians
Deputy members of the Storting
Rogaland politicians